John Hart (born 20 March 1982 in Wimbledon, England) is a retired rugby union player for London Wasps in the Aviva Premiership. His position of choice is at number eight.  Hart has been captain 38 times.  He came through the Wasps Academy, making his senior debut (replacement v Sale) in November 2002. In his time at the club, he played in two winning Premiership Finals in 2005 and 2008 and played a key role in the squads that won two Heineken Cup titles. Hart, who has made 165 appearances for the Wasps, retired in April 2012 for medical reasons.

References

External links
Wasps profile (dead link as of 13 July 2016)
Archived link 13 July 2016

1982 births
Living people
English rugby union players
Rugby union players from Wimbledon
Wasps RFC players
Rugby union number eights